A macromonomer is a macromolecule with one end-group that enables it to act as a monomer. Macromonomers will contribute a single monomeric unit to a chain of the completed macromolecule.

Several macromonomers have been successfully synthesized utilizing various methods such as controlled radical polymerization (CRP) and copper-catalyzed "click" coupling.

Due to the larger size of macromonomers (as opposed to the size of regular monomers), synthetic challenges are brought about, giving reason for the analysis of polymerization mechanisms. Recent studies have shown that macromonomer polymerization kinetics and mechanisms can be significantly affected by the topological effect.

References 

Polymer chemistry